Joseph Jehoida Hodges (15 July 1876 – 13 September 1930) was a Welsh international rugby union player. He was a member of the winning Welsh team who beat the 1905 touring All Blacks in the famous Match of the Century. He played club rugby for London Welsh and Newport RFC.

Hodges, along with fellow Welsh internationals George Boots, and later George Travers is recognised with adopting forward formation play in scrums and line outs. Although forwards were responsible for these areas of play, there was little defined tactics or specialisation before the early twentieth century. Hodges helped bring tactical formations and therefore a level of specialisation to forward play. He was described as a hard working and an excellent all-round player who could fill in at most positions, even on the wing.

International career

Wales
Hodges made his debut for Wales against England in 1899, after only his second season playing for Newport. Hodges played in three Triple Crown winning campaigns, provided forward resistance against the famous 1905 All Black 'loose head' and was part of Wales' first away win to Scotland. The later included a full on fist fight between the packs.

One of Hodges most impressive moments in a Welsh shirt was in the 1903 match against England. Welsh winger Tom Pearson had taken a heavy blow to the ribs by England's notoriously heavy tackler Gamlin, and was forced to retire. Hodges showed his famous adaptability when moved to the wing to cover Pearson's position and scored three tries in a 21-5 victory for the Welsh.

International games played
Wales
 England 1899, 1900, 1901, 1902, 1903, 1904, 1905, 1906
 Ireland 1899, 1900, 1902, 1903, 1905, 1906
 New Zealand 1905
 Scotland 1899, 1900, 1901, 1902, 1903, 1904, 1905, 1906

Later career and death
After leaving club rugby Hodges became a publican, first at the Salvation Hotel in Newport and then at the Park Hotel, Waunlwyd. Hodges died on 13 September 1930; his body was returned to his birth town of Risca where he was buried on 17 September at Cromwell Road cemetery. His coffin was borne by former Welsh internationals.

Bibliography

References

1876 births
1930 deaths
Newport RFC players
Rugby union forwards
Rugby union players from Risca
Wales international rugby union players
Welsh miners
Welsh rugby union players